Renata Lais de Arruda (born 18 February 1999) is a Brazilian handballer for CS Gloria 2018 and the Brazilian national team.

She was part of the Brazilian handball team in the Pan American Games in Lima 2019, winning the championship and a place at the Olympic Games in Tokyo.

Achievements
2016 Pan American Women's Youth Handball Championship: Best player
2016 Pan American Women's Youth Handball Championship: All star team goalkeeper
2021 South and Central American Women's Handball Championship: All star team goalkeeper

References

External links
 
 
 

1999 births
Living people
Brazilian female handball players
Pan American Games medalists in handball
Pan American Games gold medalists for Brazil
Handball players at the 2019 Pan American Games
Expatriate handball players
Brazilian expatriate sportspeople in Spain
Sportspeople from Recife
Medalists at the 2019 Pan American Games
Handball players at the 2020 Summer Olympics
20th-century Brazilian women
21st-century Brazilian women